Paracanoe debuted at the 2016 Summer Paralympics in Rio de Janeiro. A meeting of the International Paralympic Committee in Guangzhou, China in 2010 decided to add paracanoe to the roster of the Summer Paralympic Games.

Paracanoe is a variant of canoeing for athletes with a variety of physical disabilities. The sport is governed by the International Canoe Federation (ICF).

Events

Competition at the Summer Paralympic Games consists of sprint races over a 200m straight line course. Eight different events are held.

Equipment
The first paracanoe programme at the Paralympics in 2016 featured competitors using single kayaks (K1). For the 2020 paracanoe competitions, a second type of boat, the va'a, was added. This is an outrigger canoe propelled by a single bladed paddle.

Competitor classification

There are three different classes for competitors with different physical mobility impairments:
 KL1 - only arms are used for paddling 
 KL2 / VL2 - trunk and arms are used for paddling
 KL3 / VL3 - legs, trunk and arms are used for paddling

Medal table 
Updated to 2020 Summer Paralympics

Paralympic medalists

Men
 KL1

The KL1 Class is for paracanoe paddlers who have very limited or no trunk function and no leg function.

KL2

The KL 2 class is for paracanoe paddlers with partial leg and trunk function alongside good arm strength.  A KL2 class paddler should be able to sit upright within the kayak but may require a backrest.

KL3

The KL3 class is for paracanoe paddlers with trunk function and partial leg function.

VL2

The VL2 classification mirrors the KL2 classification but in reference to the Va'a outrigger canoe type.

VL3

The VL3 classification mirrors the KL3 classification but in reference to the Va'a outrigger canoe type. Some KL2 paddlers will qualify in this classification as a consequence of the extra stability of the outrigger boat.

Women
 KL1

The KL1 Class is for paracanoe paddlers who have very limited or no trunk function and no leg function.

KL2

The KL 2 class is for paracanoe paddlers with partial leg and trunk function alongside good arm strength.  A KL2 class paddler should be able to sit upright within the kayak but may require a backrest.

KL3

The KL3 class is for paracanoe paddlers with trunk function and partial leg function.

VL2

Multiple Medalists

The following canoeists have won 2 or more medals in para canoe at the Paralympic Games.

Correct as of 16 September 2021:

References

 
Paralympics
Sports at the Summer Paralympics
Paracanoe